Kharehpu (also Romanized as Kharehpū; also known as Kharapu and Khorramkoh) is a village in Kalisham Rural District, Amarlu District, Rudbar County, Gilan Province, Iran. At the 2006 census, its population was 343, in 107 families.

See also

1990 Manjil–Rudbar earthquake

References 

 سایت روستای خُرّمکوه
 E. Arabani Modified: book Gilan
 Specified culture
 Lexicon Dehkhoda
 Yasnt Louis Rabynv: Province Darlmrzgylan
 Book of Amarlu - M.M.Zand
 http://www.fallingrain.com/world/IR/8/Kharapu.html

Populated places in Rudbar County